The Acura CL is a midsize grand tourer manufactured by Honda's Acura brand from 1996 until 2003. The CL is often thought to have been a replacement for the Acura Legend coupe.  It was not directly related to the first gen TL either, a Japanese-built model which replaced the Vigor and had a longitudinal engine layout. With the advent of the second generation TL in 1999, the transverse engined CL became more precisely a TL coupe. All Acura CLs were built at Honda's plant in East Liberty, Ohio, which is also the plant that builds the Honda Civic.  The second generation TL and the Honda Accord upon which the Acura CLs were based, are built at Honda's plant in Marysville, Ohio, a few miles away from East Liberty. The CL was the first Acura to be built in the United States.

Following the end of the 1995 model year, the Acura Legend coupe disappeared from Acura's lineup when the sedan version was renamed the Acura RL. The CL was not a direct replacement for the Legend coupe as it no longer shared the same chassis as its sedan counterpart, and was not made in Japan, unlike the RL. Because Acura no longer had a suitable Legend coupe replacement, they created this vehicle. With the release of the TL and 3.5RL in 1996, Acura transitioned to alphanumeric and/or two-letter names, naming of all of its vehicles (with the exception of the Integra which kept its name until the 2001 model year). Although the CL was considered to be a satisfactory vehicle, it never gained traction or popularity like the other Acura coupes.

First generation (1996–1999)

For the 1997 model year, early models having been licensed as 1996 models, the CL was offered with either a 3.0 L J30 V6 producing , or a  2.2 L (F22B1) I4 engine.

Both the 4-cylinder and 6-cylinder CL offered a "Premium" trim level which offered leather upholstery (with heated front seats in the 3.0), and in the 3.0, an Acura/Bose stereo. For the 1999 model year, the "Premium" trim level was eliminated, and leather upholstery became standard on all models, as was a trunk cargo net. The alloy wheel design was different on the 3.0 for each year, moving from a five-spoke design (MY 1997) to a seven-spoke design (MY 1998), to a different multi-spoke alloy design for the 1999 model year. The 2.2/2.3 CL used a six-spoke design for 1997, then moved to a 5-spoke double-prong design for 1998 and 1999. The 4-cylinder model had an option for a 5-speed manual transmission. The CL also featured galvanized body panels which helps to prevent rust.

 1996–1999 Acura CL 3.0 L V6 – 
 1996–1997 Acura CL 2.2 L I4 – 
 1997–1999 Acura CL 2.3 L I4 –

Second generation (2000–2003)

For the 1999 model year, the Acura CL's sibling, the TL, was redesigned. The CL, however, was never produced as a 2000 model and instead in March 2000 the completely redesigned Acura CL was released as a 2001 model featuring a 3.2 L SOHC VTEC J-series V6. A navigation system was also available along with the Type-S model, denoting Acura's 'Sport' edition. While the regular CL featured a  V6, the Type-S boasted a  V6 with 17-inch wheels, a firmer suspension, slightly larger brakes, and firmer seats. At the time, the Type-S was the most powerful front-wheel drive vehicle Honda had ever manufactured.

In 2002, the CL Type-S was offered, as a 2003 model, with a close-ratio 6-speed manual transmission with a helical limited-slip differential. The 6-speed CL deleted some minor interior features from the automatic, such as a center console light. Also, the heated seats only featured one heat setting (vs. high and low in the auto). VSA and TCS were also not found on the 6-speed car, and as such, a 3-channel ABS unit was used. One of the main criticisms of the CL was that a manual transmission had been dropped when the car was redesigned for the 2001 model year. Very few manual transmission models were built; there were 2,691 without navigation and 820 with navigation, for a total of 3,511. Despite such small numbers of manual transmissions, there was still a greater demand than Acura had expected. The 6-speed car was highly praised by critics, with one calling it "the high point of Acura performance outside the NSX and Integra Type-R". However, with the CL's sister car, the TL, coming up on a redesign for the 2004 model year, the CL was dropped from Acura's lineup and to this day Acura has no mid-size luxury coupe replacement. Total Acura CL sales from 2000 until 2003, when the last new model was sold, was less than 31,000 units. The CL's manual transmission survives in the 3rd generation TL and 7th generation Honda Accord.

The model year 2003 also saw cosmetic changes to the CL. The 5-watt road/fog lamps found on the 2001–02 models were deleted, and non-functional air vents were installed in their place. The grille surround and door handles were now body color, as opposed to being chrome on the 01–02. The side mirrors were also redesigned (for both the 2002 and 2003 models) by having a more square shape, full-body matched paint, and tinted glass since customers had complained about excessive wind noise coming from the mirror seam. The 2003 models also saw new headlights which now featured a blacked-out interior, and the taillight lenses had a cleared turn signal and reverse light. Type-S's now included updated 17 × 7" 12-spoke wheels. Revised thicker exhaust tips were also a new addition. Canadian CLs offer daytime running lights and a windshield washer fluid level sensor as standard equipment (USDM CLs do not have these as an option).

 2000–2003 Acura 3.2 CL – ,  mpg: 17 city/27 hwy. (5AT)
 2000–2003 Acura 3.2 CL Type S –  at 6,100 rpm,  at 3,500–5,500 rpm. mpg: 19 city/29 hwy (6MT), 17 city/27 hwy. (5AT)

High Performance Models
In 2002, Honda Access America developed a performance package for the CL Type S, which was built in concert with tuning firm Comptech. A specially designed Eaton twin-screw Roots-type supercharger was coupled with numerous suspension, exhaust, braking, and drivetrain enhancements. 0 to 60 mph times of the coupe were reduced from 6.0 seconds on a stock Type S to 5.7 seconds with the modifications. The complete tuning and appearance package added $22,412 to the $31,050 base price of the CL Type S.

Automatic transmission concerns
Problems have been seen with the 2nd generation CL models equipped with automatic transmissions (manual transmission models are unaffected). Reports say that after an average of around 40,000 miles, the transmission experiences gear failures, such as downshifts, slipping, flaring and not shifting, and leaking.

One main cause is excessive wear of the 3rd gear clutch pack, resulting in large amounts of debris blocking the flow of transmission fluid. Many owners reported problems with the replacement transmissions as well. Similar transmission-related issues exist in the Honda Accord, Acura MDX, Acura TL as well as the Honda Odyssey.

Due to many failures, the manufacturer extended the warranty on the automatic transmission on some CLs and TLs for 7 years, . Many replacement rebuilt units had problems. Despite the conversion to kilometers, the class action settlement applies only for persons and entities residing in the United States.

In addition, there was an unrelated transmission recall for safety reasons. One gear tended to overheat, break and cause the transmission to lock up. Since this failure would cause the car to come to a sudden stop, this might cause accidents. Further information on the transmission issue was available on enthusiast forums and at the official Acura Service Bulletin.

Sales

References

External links

CL
Front-wheel-drive vehicles
Coupés
2000s cars
Cars introduced in 1996